The Tolar Petroglyph Site is an archeological site in Sweetwater County, Wyoming. The site includes a sandstone rock formation with 32 panels of petroglyphs running for  along the rock face. Many of the illustrations are of horse-mounted people of the Plains Indians in historical times. Other motifs include the turtle motif, spirit bear and shield-carrying warriors.

The site was placed on the National Register of Historic Places on September 30, 2014.

References

External links
 Tolar Petroglyph Site at the Wyoming State Historic Preservation Office

		
National Register of Historic Places in Sweetwater County, Wyoming
Archaeological sites on the National Register of Historic Places in Wyoming